is a Japanese former footballer who plays as a Midfielder.

Career
Funayama announcement officially retirement from football in 2016.

Personal life
His younger brother Takayuki also plays football and currently play in JFL club, ReinMeer Aomori.

Career statistics

Club
.

Honours

Club
Kashima Antlers
 J. League Division 1 Champions (2) : 2008, 2007

References

External links

1985 births
Living people
People from Narita, Chiba
Ryutsu Keizai University alumni
Association football people from Chiba Prefecture
Japanese footballers
J1 League players
J2 League players
Yuji Funayama
Yuji Funayama
Kashima Antlers players
Cerezo Osaka players
Montedio Yamagata players
Avispa Fukuoka players
Tokyo Verdy players
Yuji Funayama
Yuji Funayama
Japanese expatriate footballers
Japanese expatriate sportspeople in Thailand
Expatriate footballers in Thailand
Association football midfielders